Polling in Tirol is a municipality in the district of Innsbruck-Land in the Austrian state of Tyrol located 17 km west of Innsbruck and 7 km before Telfs. The location was mentioned as “Pollinga” in 763 for the first time.

Population

References

External links

Cities and towns in Innsbruck-Land District